"I Found Love" is a song recorded by English girl group Bananarama. The instrumental track was composed by Japanese dance producer Tetsuya Komuro while group members Sara Dallin and Keren Woodward wrote lyrics and recorded their vocals over it. Bananarama didn't like the result, so they asked their producer Gary Miller to remix it. Miller's mix was issued as the A-side of the "I Found Love" single, as the "ROZI Mix".

"I Found Love" was issued as a double-A-side in Japan with "Every Shade of Blue". When the I Found Love album was released in the United States, it was re-titled Ultra Violet and "I Found Love" appeared as a bonus track only.

Music video
The music video features the pair performing the song in large crinoline skirts in front of a mansion. These scenes are intercut with shots of the duo being driven through London.

Remixes
Japanese 3-inch CD single
"I Found Love" (ROZI-Mix)
Remixed by MAXImizor (aka Gary Miller)
"Every Shade of Blue"
"I Found Love" (Original Mix)

Other versions
"I Found Love" (Album Version)
"I Found Love" (Video Mix)
"I Found Love" (Remininsence Mix)

References

1995 singles
Bananarama songs
Songs written by Sara Dallin
Songs written by Keren Woodward
Songs written by Tetsuya Komuro
Avex Trax singles